Ihor Lvovych Rainin or Raynin (born 6 August 1973) is a Ukrainian politician. From February 2015 until August 2016 he was governor of Kharkiv Oblast. On 29 Aug 2016, he was promoted to head of the Presidential Administration of Ukraine. Under a presidential decrees signed on 21 May 2019, he was dismissed by new President Volodymyr Zelensky.

Biography
In 1997 Rainin graduated from the Kharkiv Aviation Institute, as an engineer. Rainin started his professional life with various job in the engineering field before 2000. In 2000, he graduated from the Kharkiv branch of the Ukrainian Academy of Public Administration under the President of Ukraine. He then had various leading civil service positions in the Kharkiv Oblast administration. From June 2010 till march 2014 Rainin was deputy director of the company "Sintofleks" (located in Kharkiv).

In the 2010 Ukrainian local elections Rainin was elected deputy of the Kharkiv Regional (Oblast) Council (parliament) for the party (of which he also was a member of) "Fatherland". He was placed 8th on the ballot. Rainin became first deputy head of the faction of this party. And he eventually on 20 October 2014 became head of the parliamentary group "Unity of Kharkiv". Having served as deputy chairman of the Kharkiv Regional State Administration from March 2014, he was appointed first deputy chairman the following month. In November 2014, he became a deputy head of Petro Poroshenko's presidential administration. Poroshenko appointed Rainin governor of Kharkiv Oblast on 3 February 2015. Late February 2015 Rainin also became the head of the Kharkiv Oblast branch of the Petro Poroshenko Bloc. In the October 2015 Ukrainian local elections Rainin was elected to the Kharkiv Oblast Council. On 29 Aug 2016 Poroshenko promoted Rainin to head his Presidential Administration. Since Oblast Councils members are able to combine their duties with other work, Rainin kept his seat in the Kharkiv Oblast Council. Under a presidential decrees signed on 21 May 2019 he was dismissed as head of the Presidential Administration by new President Volodymyr Zelensky who appointed Andriy Bohdan in his place.

On 27 November 2018 Rainin was appointment chairman of the Kharkiv Oblast branch of the Opposition Platform — For Life party.

References 

1973 births
Living people
Politicians from Kharkiv
National Aerospace University – Kharkiv Aviation Institute alumni
National Academy of State Administration alumni
Governors of Kharkiv Oblast
All-Ukrainian Union "Fatherland" politicians
Petro Poroshenko Bloc politicians
Opposition Platform — For Life politicians
Head of the Presidential Administration of Ukraine